Pittsburgh Public Schools is the public school district serving the city of Pittsburgh, Pennsylvania and adjacent Mount Oliver, Pennsylvania. As of the 2021–2022 school year, the district operates 54 schools with 4,192 employees (2,070 teachers) and 20,350 students, and has a budget of $668.3 million.

History
The formation of Pittsburgh's public schools in 1835 was due to the passing of the Pennsylvania Free Public School Act of 1834. This act provided government aid for establishing a city school system, which included the creation of four self-governed wards. Twenty years later, the wards were disbanded, and the Central Board of Education was founded. This board would govern the entire school district, which would consist of nine wards or sub- districts. The first city superintendent of schools was elected in 1868. In 1911, the School Code of the Commonwealth of Pennsylvania modified the existing system to include a Board of Public education that would oversee sixty-one sub-districts and two central boards. The Public School Code (Title 22) of 1949 further regulated the provisions and establishment of Pennsylvania state schools.

As stated in numerous district annual budgets, including 2021, "Although public education in Pittsburgh dates back to 1835, the consolidated District was founded in November 1911, as a result of an educational reform movement that combined the former 'ward' schools into one system with standardized educational and business policies. Initially the district was governed by an appointed Board of 15 members, but since 1976 has been governed by a nine-member Board elected by districts of relatively equal populations."

Academics
In February 2006, eight underperforming schools were transformed into Accelerated Learning Academies(ALAs). The schools had 10 days added to their school calendar and 45 minutes of instructional time were added each day. The ALAs use the America's Choice Design Model, developed by the National Center on Education and the Economy.

In March 2006, the district contracted with Kaplan K12 Learning Services to develop a single, district-wide curriculum.

The Pittsburgh Promise

On December 13, 2006 Pittsburgh Mayor Luke Ravenstahl and then Superintendent Mark Roosevelt announced an initiative called The Pittsburgh Promise. In 2008, the program became available to all graduates satisfying the criteria for a scholarship to any accredited post-secondary institution within Pennsylvania. The five to seven million dollars per year necessary to fund the program would be raised through private contributions from foundations and corporations.

In January 2007, the Pittsburgh Federation of Teachers made the first contribution to The Pittsburgh Promise scholarship program. In 2008, the University of Pittsburgh Medical Center made a $10 million donation with a commitment for as much as $90 million in additional matching funds over the next nine years.

Board of Public Education of Pittsburgh
The Pittsburgh Public Schools has an elected, nine-member Board of Directors. The members serve a four-year term and represent districts within the city and the nearby borough of Mount Oliver. Like all other school board members in Pennsylvania, they receive no pay.

Superintendent of Schools and Administration
On July 21, 2022, the Pittsburgh Board of Education announced that Dr. Wayne N. Walters will serve as Superintendent of Pittsburgh Public Schools. On August 1, 2022, Dr. Walters took over the top leadership position after serving as interim Superintendent for a 10-month period. The School District has various administrative departments: Office of the Superintendent, Student Support Services, Althetics, Human Resources, Cirriculm and Instruction, Data, Research, Evaluation and Assessment, Facilities, Finance, and Law.

Schools

Elementary schools (K–5)

Allegheny Traditional Academy Elementary School
Arsenal Elementary School
Banksville Elementary School
Beechwood Elementary School
Concord Elementary School
Dilworth Traditional Academy
Faison K-5
Fulton Academy of Geographic and Life Sciences
Grandview Elementary School
Lincoln School (two campuses: K–4 & 5–8)
Liberty Elementary School
Linden Elementary School
Miller African Centered Academy
Minadeo Elementary School
Phillips K-5
Pittsburgh Montessori (also: Pre-K)
Roosevelt Elementary School (two campuses: Pre-K–1 & 2–5)
Spring Hill Elementary School
West Liberty Elementary School
Westwood Elementary School 
Whittier Elementary School
Woolslair Elementary School

K–8 Schools

Arlington 
Brookline School
Carmalt Academy of Science and Technology
Colfax K-8
Greenfield School
King PreK-8
Langley
Manchester PreK-8
Mifflin School
Morrow Elementary School
Sunnyside PreK-8

Middle Schools (6–8) and Accelerated Learning Academies

Allegheny Traditional Academy Middle School
Arlington 
Arsenal Middle School
Pittsburgh Classical Academy Middle School
Schiller Classical Academy Middle School
South Brook Middle School
South Hills Middle School
Sterrett Classical Academy
Weil PreK-5

Secondary Schools, grades 9-12 and 6-12

Barack Obama Academy of International Studies 6-12
Brashear High School
Carrick High School
Perry Traditional Academy
Pittsburgh Creative and Performing Arts School (6-12)
Pittsburgh Science and Technology Academy (6-12)
Taylor Allderdice High School
University Preparatory School (6-12)
Westinghouse High School

Special schools

Conroy Education Center
Oliver Citywide Academy
Pioneer Education Center
Pittsburgh Gifted Center
Student Achievement Center High School
Student Achievement Center Middle School
Clayton Academy
Pittsburgh Online Academy

Charter schools
As required by Pennsylvania state law, the District funds a number of charter schools:

Academy Charter School (9–12)
Career Connections Charter High School (9–12) — Charter renewed for five years on 21 March 2007
City Charter High School (9–12) — Charter renewed for five years on 8 November 2006
The Environmental Charter School at Frick Park K–8
Hill House Passport Academy Charter School
Manchester Academic Charter School (K–8)
Northside Urban Pathways Charter School (6–12)
Renaissance Academy of Pittsburgh Alternative of Hope (K–5) — Charter renewal denied by Board on 25 April 2006
Urban League of Pittsburgh Charter School (K–5)

Closed schools

Career Connections Charter Middle School - closed 2006

See also

 List of school districts in Pennsylvania

Notes and references

External links

Pittsburgh Public Schools
 
 
 

Education in Pittsburgh
1794 establishments in Pennsylvania
School districts in Allegheny County, Pennsylvania